A cherub (plural cherubim;  kərūḇ, pl.  kərūḇīm, likely borrowed from a derived form of  karabu "to bless" such as  karibu, "one who blesses", a name for the lamassu) is one of the unearthly beings who directly attend to God, according to Abrahamic religions. The numerous depictions of cherubim assign to them many different roles, such as protecting the entrance of the Garden of Eden.

Abrahamic religious traditions 
In Jewish angelic hierarchy, cherubim have the ninth (second-lowest) rank in Maimonides' Mishneh Torah (12th century), and the third rank in Kabbalistic works such as Berit Menuchah (14th century).
De Coelesti Hierarchia places them in the highest rank alongside Seraphim and Thrones.

In the Book of Ezekiel and (at least some) Christian icons, the cherub is depicted as having two pairs of wings, and four faces: that of a lion (representative of all wild animals), an ox (domestic animals), a human (humanity), and an eagle (birds). As described by Ezekiel, "Their legs were straight, the soles of their feet like the hooves of a bull, gleaming like polished brass."

Later tradition ascribes to them a variety of physical appearances. Some early midrashic literature conceives of them as non-corporeal. In Western Christian tradition, cherubim have become associated with the putto (derived from classical Cupid / Eros figure), resulting in depictions of cherubim as small, plump, winged boys.

In Islam,  or   refers to the highest angels near to God, in contrast to the messenger angels (rasul). They include the Bearers of the Throne, the angels arround the throne, and the archangels. The angels of mercy subordinative to Michael are also identified as cherubim. In Ismailism, there are Seven Archangels referred to as cherubim.

Cherubim are also mentioned in the Second Treatise of the Great Seth, a 3rd century Gnostic writing.

Etymology 
Delitzch's Assyrisches Handwörterbuch (1896) connected the name keruv with Assyrian kirubu (a name of the shedu or lamassu) and karabu ("great, mighty"). 

Karppe (1897) glossed Babylonian karâbu as "propitious" rather than "mighty". 

Dhorme (1926) connected the Hebrew name to Assyrian kāribu (diminutive kurību), a term used to refer to intercessory beings (and statues of such beings) that plead with the gods on behalf of humanity. 

The folk etymology connecting cherub to a Hebrew word for "youthful" is due to Abbahu (3rd century).

Functions 

The Israelite cherubim are described as fulfilling a variety of functions – most often, they are described as bolstering the throne of Yahweh. Ezekiel's vision of the cherubim also emulate this, as the conjoined wingspan of the four cherubim is described as forming the boundary of the divine chariot. Likewise, on the "mercy seat" of the Ark of the Covenant, two cherubim are described as bounding the ark and forming a space through which Yahweh would appear – however, aside from the instruction that they be beaten out of the sides of the ark, there are no details about these cherubim specified in the text. The status of the cherubim as constituting a sort-of vehicle for Yahweh is present in Ezekiel's visions, the Books of Samuel, the parallel passages in the later Books of Chronicles, and passages in the early Psalms: for example, "and he rode upon a cherub and did fly: and he was seen upon the wings of the wind."

The traditional Hebrew conception of cherubim as guardians of the Garden of Eden is backed by the Semitic belief of beings of superhuman power and devoid of human feelings, whose duty it was to represent the gods, and as guardians of their sanctuaries to repel intruders; these conceptions in turn are similar to an account found on Tablet 9 of the inscriptions found at Nimrud.

Appearance 

Aside from Ezekiel's vision, no detailed attestations of cherubim survive, and Ezekiel's description of the tetramorph being may not be the same as the cherubim of the historic Israelites. All that can be gleaned about the cherubim of the Israelites come from potential equivalences in the cultures which surrounded them.

The appearance of the cherubim continue to be a subject of debate. Mythological hybrids are common in the art of the Ancient Near East. One example is the Babylonian lamassu or shedu, a protective spirit with a sphinx-like form, possessing the wings of an eagle, the body of a lion or bull, and the head of a king. This was adopted largely in Phoenicia. The wings, because of their artistic beauty and symbolic use as a mark of creatures of the heavens, soon became the most prominent part, and animals of various kinds were adorned with wings; consequently, wings were bestowed also upon human forms, thus leading to the stereotypical image of an angel.

William F. Albright (1938) argued that "the winged lion with human head" found in Phoenicia and Canaan from the Late Bronze Age is "much more common than any other winged creature, so much so that its identification with the cherub is certain". A possibly related source is the human-bodied Hittite griffin, which, unlike other griffins, appear almost always not as a fierce bird of prey, but seated in calm dignity, like an irresistible guardian of holy things; some have proposed that the word griffin may be cognate with cherubim (kruv > grups). While Ezekiel initially describes the tetramorph cherubim as having
 "the face of a man ... the face of a lion ... the face of an ox ... and ... the face of an eagle"; in the  this formula is repeated as "the face of the cherub ... the face of a man ... the face of a lion ... the face of an eagle";
which (given that "ox" has apparently been substituted with "the cherub") some have taken to imply that cherubim were envisioned to have the head of a bovine.

In particular resonance with the idea of cherubim embodying the throne of God, numerous pieces of art from Phoenicia, Ancient Egypt, and even Tel Megiddo in northern Israel depict kings or deities being carried on their thrones by hybrid winged creatures.

If this animalistic form is how the ancient Israelites envisioned cherubim, it raises more questions than it answers. For one, it is difficult to visualize the cherubim of the Ark of the Covenant as quadrupedal creatures with backward-facing wings, as these cherubim were meant to face each other and have their wings meet, while still remaining on the edges of the cover from which they were beaten. At the same time, these creatures have little to no resemblance to the cherubim in Ezekiel's vision. 

On the other hand, even if cherubim had a more humanoid form, this still would not entirely match Ezekiel's vision and likewise seemingly clashes with the apparently equivalent archetypes of the cultures surrounding the Israelites, which almost uniformly depicted beings which served analogous purposes to Israel's cherubim as largely animalistic in shape. All of this may indicate that the Israelite conception of the cherubs appearance may not have been wholly consistent.

Hebrew Bible

The cherubim are the most frequently occurring heavenly creature in the Hebrew Bible, as the Hebrew word appears 91 times. The first occurrence is in the Book of Genesis 3:24. Despite these many references, the role of the cherubim is never explicitly elucidated. While Hebrew tradition must have conceived of the cherubim as guardians of the Garden of Eden (in which they guard the way to the Tree of life), they are often depicted as performing other roles; for example in the Book of Ezekiel, they transport Yahweh's throne. The cherub who appears in the "Song of David", a poem which occurs twice in the Hebrew Bible, in 2 Samuel 22 and Psalm 18, participates in Yahweh's theophany and is imagined as a vehicle upon which the deity descends to earth from heaven in order to rescue the speaker (see 2 Samuel 22:11, Psalm 18:10).

In Exodus 25:18–22, God tells Moses to make multiple images of cherubim at specific points around the Ark of the Covenant. Many appearances of the words cherub and cherubim in the Bible refer to the gold cherubim images on the mercy seat of the Ark, as well as images on the curtains of the Tabernacle and in Solomon's Temple, including two measuring ten cubits high.

In , Hezekiah prays, addressing God as "enthroned above the cherubim" (referring to the mercy seat). In regard's to Solomon's Temple as described in 1 Kings, Eichler renders the phrase yoshev ha-keruvim  as “who dwells among the cherubim”. This phrase is the same in 1 Kings and Isaiah. Eichler's interpretation in contrast to common translations for many years that rendered it as “who sits upon the cherubim”. This has implications for the understanding of whether the ark of the covenant in the Temple was literally YHWH's throne or simply an indicator of YHWH's immanence.

Cherubim feature at some length in the Book of Ezekiel. While they first appear in chapter one, in which they are transporting the throne of God by the river Chebar, they are not called cherubim until chapter 10. In Ezekiel 1:5–11 they are described as having the likeness of a man, and having four faces: that of a man, a lion (on the right side), and ox (on the left side), and an eagle. The four faces represent the four domains of God's rule: the man represents humanity; the lion, wild animals; the ox, domestic animals; and the eagle, birds. These faces peer out from the center of an array of four wings; these wings are joined to each other, two of these are stretched upward, and the other two cover their bodies. Under their wings are human hands; their legs are described as straight, and their feet like those of a calf, shining like polished brass. Between the creatures glowing coals that moved between them could be seen, their fire "went up and down", and lightning burst forth from it. The cherubs also moved like flashes of lightning.

In Ezekiel chapter 10, another full description of the cherubim appears with slight differences in details. Three of the four faces are the same – man, lion and eagle – but where chapter one has the face of an ox, Ezekiel 10:14 says "face of a cherub". Ezekiel equates the cherubim of chapter ten with the living creatures of chapter one: "They were the same creatures (חיה) I had seen by the river Chebar" (Ezekiel 10:15) and "These were the living creatures I had seen under the God of Israel on the banks of the river Chebar" (Ezekiel 10:20). In Ezekiel 41:18–20, they are portrayed as having two faces, although this is probably because they are depicted in profile.

In Judaism

In rabbinic literature, the two cherubim are described as being human-like figures with wings, one a boy and the other a girl, placed on the opposite ends of the Mercy seat in the inner-sanctum of God's house.

Many forms of Judaism include a belief in the existence of angels, including cherubim within the Jewish angelic hierarchy. The existence of angels is generally accepted within traditional rabbinic Judaism. There is, however, a wide range of beliefs within Judaism about what angels actually are and how literally one should interpret biblical passages associated with them.

In Kabbalah there has long been a strong belief in cherubim, the cherubim and other angels regarded as having mystical roles. The Zohar, a highly significant collection of books in Jewish mysticism, states that the cherubim were led by one of their number named Kerubiel.

On the other end of the philosophical spectrum is Maimonides, who had a neo-Aristotelian interpretation of the Bible. Maimonides writes that to the wise man, one sees that what the Bible and Talmud refer to as "angels" are actually allusions to the various laws of nature; they are the principles by which the physical universe operates.

 For all forces are angels! How blind, how perniciously blind are the naive?! If you told someone who purports to be a sage of Israel that the Deity sends an angel who enters a woman's womb and there forms an embryo, he would think this a miracle and accept it as a mark of the majesty and power of the Deity, despite the fact that he believes an angel to be a body of fire one third the size of the entire world. All this, he thinks, is possible for God.

 But if you tell him that God placed in the sperm the power of forming and demarcating these organs, and that this is the angel, or that all forms are produced by the Active Intellect; that here is the angel, the "vice-regent of the world" constantly mentioned by the sages, then he will recoil. — The Guide for the Perplexed II:4

 For he [the naive person] does not understand that the true majesty and power are in the bringing into being of forces which are active in a thing although they cannot be perceived by the senses ... Thus the Sages reveal to the aware that the imaginative faculty is also called an angel; and the mind is called a cherub'''. How beautiful this will appear to the sophisticated mind, and how disturbing to the primitive." —  The Guide for the Perplexed II:6.

Maimonides says that the figures of the cherubim were placed in the sanctuary only to preserve among the people the belief in angels, there being two in order that the people might not be led to believe that they were the image of God.

Cherubim are discussed within the midrash literature. The two cherubim placed by God at the entrance of paradise were angels created on the third day, and therefore they had no definite shape; appearing either as men or women, or as spirits or angelic beings. The cherubim were the first objects created in the universe. The following sentence of the Midrash is characteristic:
 "When a man sleeps, the body tells to the soul (neshamah) what it has done during the day; the soul then reports it to the spirit (nefesh), the spirit to the angel, the angel to the cherub, and the cherub to the seraph, who then brings it before God".Eccl. Rabbah x. 20

In early Jewish tradition there existed the notion that cherubim had youthful, human features, due to the etymologization of the name by Abbahu (3rd century). Before this, some early midrashic literature conceived of the cherubim as non-corporeal. In the first century AD, Josephus claimed:
 "No one can tell, or even conjecture, what was the shape of these cherubim."

A midrash states that when Pharaoh pursued Israel at the Red Sea, God took a cherub from the wheels of His throne and flew to the spot, for God inspects the heavenly worlds while sitting on a cherub. The cherub, however, is "something not material", and is carried by God, not vice versa.Midr. Teh. xviii. 15

In the passages of the Talmud that describe the heavens and their inhabitants, the seraphim, ofannim, and living creatures are mentioned, but not the cherubim; and the ancient liturgy also mentions only these three classes.

In the Talmud, Jose the Galilean holds that when the Birkat Hamazon (grace after meals) is recited by at least ten thousand seated at one meal, a special blessing,
 "Blessed is Ha-Shem our God, the God of Israel, who dwells between the cherubim",
is added to the regular liturgy.

 In Christianity 

In Medieval theology, following the writings of Pseudo-Dionysius, the cherubim are the second highest rank in the angelic hierarchy, following the seraphim.

Cherubim are regarded in traditional Christian angelology as angels of the second highest order of the ninefold celestial hierarchy. De Coelesti Hierarchia (c. 5th century) lists them alongside Seraphim and Thrones.

According to Thomas Aquinas, the cherubim are characterized by knowledge, in contrast to seraphim, who are characterized by their "burning love to God".

In Western art, cherubim became associated with the putto and the Greco-Roman god Cupid/Eros, with depictions as small, plump, winged boys.

Artistic representations of cherubim in Early Christian and Byzantine art sometimes diverged from scriptural descriptions. The earliest known depiction of the tetramorph cherubim is the 5th–6th century apse mosaic found in the Thessalonian Church of Hosios David.

 In Islam 

Cherubim, identified as a class of the Muqarraboon in the Quran,  are a class of angels near the presence of God. They are entrusted with praising God and interceding for humans. They are usually identified either with a class of angels separate or include various angels absorbed in the presence of God: the canonical four Islamic archangels Jibra’il (Gabriel), Mika’il (Michael), Izra’il (Azrael) and Isra’fil (Raphael), the actual cherubim, and the Bearers of the Throne. 

Some scholars had a more precise approach: Ibn Kathir distinguishes between the angels of the throne and the cherubim. In a 13th-14th Century work called  "Book of the Wonders of Creation and the peculiarities of Existing Things" the cherubim belong to an order below the Bearers of the Throne, who in turn are identified with seraphim instead. Abu Ishaq al-Tha'labi places the cherubim as the highest angels only next to the Bearers of the Throne. Similarly, al-Razi distinguishes between the angels carrying the throne (seraphim) and the angels around the throne (cherubim).

The Quran mentions the Muqarraboon in An-Nisa verse 172, angels who worship God and are not proud. Further, cherubim appear in Miraj literature and Qisas Al-Anbiya. The cherubim around the throne are continuously praising God with the tasbih: "Glory to Allah!" They are described as bright as no one of the lower angels can envision them. Cherubim as angels of mercy, created by the tears of Michael are not identified with the angels in God's presence, but of lower rank. They too, request God to pardon humans. In contrast to the messenger angels, the cherubim (and seraphim) always remain in the presence of God. If they stop praising God, they fall.

Mohammad-Baqer Majlesi narrates about a fallen cherub encountered by Muhammad in the form of a snake. The snake tells him that he did not performed dhikr (remembrance of God) for a moment, and so God was angry with him and cast him down to earth in the form of a snake. Then Muhammad went to Hasan and Husayn. Together they interceded (Tawassul) for the angel and God restored him to his angelic form. A similar story appears in Tabari's Bishara. An angel called Futrus, described as an "angel-cherub" (malak al-karubiyyin), was sent by God, but since the angel failed to complete his task in time, God broke one of his wings. Muhammad interceded for the cherub, and God forgave the fallen angel, whereupon he became the guardian for Hussain's grave.

 See also 
 Buraq
 Cherubism (medical condition)
 List of angels in theology
 Kamadeva
 Lamassu
 Merkabah mysticism

 References 

 
 
— The article looks at the yet unknown nature of the Temple's Cherubim, through linguistic investigation, fauna probabilities and artistic presentations in the ancient Biblical period.

 External links 

 Jewish Encyclopedia: Cherub
 Catholic Encyclopedia: Cherubim
 The Cherubim - some pointers and problems by Rabbi Dr Raymond Apple
 
 "What Kind of Creatures Are the Cherubim?" TheTorah'' (2016)

 
Angels in Christianity
Angels in Islam
Angels in Judaism
Classes of angels
Hebrew words and phrases in the Hebrew Bible
Heraldic charges
Tabernacle and Temples in Jerusalem